, also known as Juka Shinto (literally "Shinto of the Learning of the Sages"), is a syncretic religious tradition that combines elements of Confucianism and Shinto.  It originated in Japan during the Edo period (1603-1868), and is sometimes referred to as "Neo-Confucian Shinto"

Modern organizations include Shinto Taiseikyo, Shinto Shusei,  and Tsuchimikado Shinto.  was a major school of Confucian Shinto.

History 
The roots of Confucian Shinto can be traced back to the 17th century, when Japanese scholars began to study Chinese Confucian texts and integrate Confucian ideas into their understanding of Shinto. The most notable of these scholars was Yamazaki Ansai (1618-1682), who developed a synthesis of Confucianism and Shinto that emphasized the importance of ethical behavior and filial piety. Ansai's teachings were further developed by his disciple, Kaibara Ekken (1630-1714), who wrote a number of influential works on Confucian Shinto, including the "Greater Learning for Women." Ekken's writings emphasized the importance of education and the cultivation of virtue, and advocated for the integration of Confucian ethics into everyday life.

In the 18th and 19th centuries, Confucian Shinto became increasingly popular among the samurai class, who saw it as a way to reconcile their duty to the emperor with their Confucian ideals of loyalty, honor, and righteousness. Confucian Shinto also gained a foothold among commoners, who were attracted to its emphasis on family values and practical ethics.

Influence and Legacy 
Confucian Shinto had a significant impact on Japanese society during the Edo period and beyond. It helped to shape the moral values and social norms of the samurai class, and played a role in the development of modern Japanese nationalism.

Confucian Shinto also had an influence on the Meiji Restoration of 1868, which marked the end of the Edo period and the beginning of modern Japan. The leaders of the restoration sought to revive traditional Japanese values and culture, and saw Confucian Shinto as a way to do so. They promoted the idea of kokutai, or the "national essence", which was based on the Confucian notion of the ruler-subject relationship and the Shinto idea of the emperor as a divine being. Fukko Shinto which was also quite significant developed in reaction to Confucian Shinto, and it was the predecessor to State Shinto.

Modern groups 
Among Sect Shinto,  and Shinto Shusei are considered Confucian influenced groups. Tsuchimikado Shinto continues the legacy as well, but it is not a member of the sect Shinto association.

References 

Confucian Shinto